Li Fangying 李方膺 (1696–1755) was a Qing Chinese painter from Jiangsu. He served as a county magistrate for 20 years. As a painter he is best known for painting plant imagery specifically pines, bamboos, plum blossoms and orchids. He was one of the Eight Eccentrics of Yangzhou.

References

External links
 Li Fangying - China culture
Museum of Fine Arts Boston

1696 births
1755 deaths
Qing dynasty painters
Painters from Nantong